Sin, in comics, may refer to:

Sin (Marvel Comics), the daughter of the Red Skull
Sin (DC Comics), an adopted daughter of Black Canary
 Sin Comics (Jay Stephens, 1993–1994), Black Eye Productions

See also
Sin (disambiguation)